Kuntur Sinqa (Quechua kuntur condor, sinqa nose, "condor nose", also spelled Condorsencca) is a mountain in the Cordillera Blanca in the Andes of Peru, about  high. It is situated in the Ancash Region, Recuay Province, Catac District. Kuntur Sinqa lies west of Mururahu at a lake named Qishqiqucha.

References

Mountains of Peru
Mountains of Ancash Region